High Ridge is an unincorporated community in Bullock County, Alabama, United States. The community was most likely named for the surrounding geography.

A post office operated under the name High Ridge from 1892 to 1907.

The Berry House, located in High Ridge, was photographed during the Historic American Buildings Survey.

The High Ridge cuesta is named for the community.

References

Unincorporated communities in Bullock County, Alabama
Unincorporated communities in Alabama